An open-access monograph is a scholarly monograph which is made openly available online with open license.

Concept
Open access is when academic research is made freely available online for anyone to read and re-use. As with open access journals, there are different business models for funding open-access books, including publication charges, institutional support, library publishing, and consortium models. Some publishers, like OECD Publishing, uses a freemium model where the ebook version is made available for free, but readers have the option to purchase a print copy. Sales of the print version subsidise the cost of producing the book. There is some evidence that making electronic editions of books open access can increase sales of the print edition.

History
While open access to journal articles has become very common, with 50% of articles published in 2011 available as open access, open access to books has not yet seen as much uptake. However, there are dedicated open-access book publishers such as Open Book Publishers, punctum books, and others who publish both books and journals, such as Open Humanities Press. A report released in 2015 by the UK's main funding body for research, the Higher Education Funding Council for England, states the importance of open access monographs: "Monographs are a vitally important and distinctive vehicle for research communication, and must be sustained in any moves to open access."

The OAPEN (Open Access Publishing in European Networks) online library and publication platform provides access to thousands of peer-reviewed academic books, mainly in the humanities and social sciences. The OAPEN Foundation  also provides a directory of open access works via Directory of Open Access Books (DOAB).

See also
Open content
Openness
Open Educational Resources
re.press
Open Library of Humanities
COPIM

References

Further reading
 "Monographs", p. 112 in Martin Paul Eve, Open Access and the Humanities, Cambridge University Press, 2014. 
 "Open-access monographs", p. 419 in Peggy Johnson, Fundamentals of Collection Development and Management, American Library Association, 2014.

External links
OAPEN Online library and publication platform
Directory of Open Access Books
 Open Access Directory - List of publishers of OA books. 
 Open Access Directory - List of OA book business models
Open Access Scholarly Information Sourcebook - Open Access Monographs

Monograph
Book publishing